Barry Mason (1935–2021) was an English songwriter.

Barry Mason may also refer to:

Barry Mason (sculptor) (born 1952), British sculptor
Barry Mason (cyclist) (1950–2011), English cycling activist
Don Barry Mason (1950–2006), founder of the Psychedelic Shamanistic Institute
Barry Mason (musician) (1947–2020), English guitarist and lutenist, director of the Early Music Centre.
 J. Barry Mason (born 1941), American academic